The Battle of Grodno (1706) refers to the battle during the Great Northern War. Grodno was a city of the Polish–Lithuanian Commonwealth at this time.

Background

Battle
The blockade of Grodno by the 31,000 men (21,000 Swedes, 10,000 Poles) strong Swedish–Polish army took place between January and March 1706 (3,000 Swedes had already died due to frostbite prior to the arrival). In the city and close vicinity there were about 41,000 Russian and Saxon troops under the command of General Field-Marshall Ogilvy as well as general Repnin. On 13 January 1706 the Swedish army coming from Poland crossed the Neman River and squeezed out the Russian cavalry units of Menshikov towards Minsk, cutting of all connections to Russia for the Grodno garrison. The situation of the Russian troops was made even more difficult after the allied Polish-Lithuanian king Augustus II quickly left Grodno in Polish direction, taking four Russian dragoon regiments with him. As a result, the Grodno garrison was left without cavalry which was necessary for reconnaissance and food supplies.

After putting Grodno under siege, the Swedes occupied Nesvizh and besieged Lyakhavichy. Meanwhile, the Russian garrison of Grodno suffered big trouble from the lack of food as well as from diseases. This took the lives of about 8,000 soldiers. After the blockade of his main troops in Grodno Peter the Great had only 12,000 men in Belarus. Being in Minsk with this army he communicated with the besieged garrison via a poruchik named Yakovlev who made his way to Grodno dressed as a Polish peasant. Besides that 14,000 Ukrainian cossacks of Mazepa were ordered to constantly engage the enemy. Peter I didn't want to have an open battle with Charles XII so far from Russia. Because of that he ordered the Grodno garrison to hold out until spring when the rivers get free of ice. Then they had to retreat behind the Neman towards Brest and further to the Dnieper what they successfully did until May 1706.

Charles estimated the direction of the Russian retreat wrongly, expecting them to retreat eastwards where he placed his main forces. Having discovered the surprisingly rapid Russian retreat towards south-west too late, he started the pursuit, hoping to catch up the Russians via the Polesia swamps shortcut. However, they proved to be impassable and Charles had to give up the pursuit of the Russians and to seek a battle with the Saxons first.

See also
Campaign of Grodno
Charles XII invasion of Poland

References

Sources
 Николай Шефов. Битвы России. Военно-историческая библиотека. М., 2002.
 Russian Army at Grodno 1706

Conflicts in 1706
1706 in Europe
Battle of Grodno (1706)
Battles involving Russia
Battles involving Sweden
Battles of the Great Northern War
Military history of Belarus